is a 1976 Japanese black-and-white 16 mm documentary film by director Mitsuo Yanagimachi that follows the exploits of young Japanese motorcyclists known as the "Black Emperors".

The 1970s in Japan saw the rise of a motorcycling movement called the bōsōzoku, which drew the interest of the media. The movie follows a member of the "Black Emperors" motorcycle club and his interaction with his parents after he gets in trouble with the police.

The Canadian post-rock band Godspeed You! Black Emperor took their name from the film.

References

External links

Full Movie - Internet Archive

1976 films
1976 documentary films
Black-and-white documentary films
Films directed by Mitsuo Yanagimachi
Japanese black-and-white films
Japanese documentary films
1970s Japanese-language films
Motorcycling films
Motorcycling subculture
1970s Japanese films